Francisco Juillet (15 June 1898 – 1987) was a Chilean cyclist. He competed in two events at the 1924 Summer Olympics and one event at the 1928 Summer Olympics.

References

External links
 

1898 births
1987 deaths
Chilean male cyclists
Olympic cyclists of Chile
Cyclists at the 1924 Summer Olympics
Cyclists at the 1928 Summer Olympics
Place of birth missing